The 2022 Andy's Frozen Custard 300 was the 27th stock car race of the 2022 NASCAR Xfinity Series, the first race of the Round of 12, and the 18th iteration of the event. The race was held on Saturday, September 24, 2022, in Fort Worth, Texas at Texas Motor Speedway, a  permanent tri-oval shaped racetrack. The race took the scheduled 200 laps to complete. Noah Gragson, driving for JR Motorsports, dominated a majority of the race, and scored his 12th career NASCAR Xfinity Series win, his fourth consecutive win, along with his seventh of the season. To fill out the podium, Austin Hill, driving for Richard Childress Racing, and Ty Gibbs, driving for Joe Gibbs Racing, would finish 2nd and 3rd, respectively. 

With Gragson's win, he is now tied with Sam Ard with the all-time record for most consecutive wins.

Background 
Texas Motor Speedway is a speedway located in the northernmost portion of the U.S. city of Fort Worth, Texas – the portion located in Denton County, Texas. The reconfigured track measures  with banked 20° in turns 1 and 2 and banked 24° in turns 3 and 4. Texas Motor Speedway is a quad-oval design, where the front straightaway juts outward slightly. The track layout is similar to Atlanta Motor Speedway and Charlotte Motor Speedway. The track is owned by Speedway Motorsports, Inc. Nicknamed “The Great American Speedway“ the racetrack facility is one of the largest motorsports venues in the world capable of hosting crowds in excess of 200,000 spectators.

Entry list 

 (R) denotes rookie driver.
 (i) denotes driver who are ineligible for series driver points.

Practice 
The only 20-minute practice session was held on Saturday, September 24, at 9:30 AM CST.

Qualifying 
Qualifying was held on Saturday, September 24, at 10:00 AM CST. Since Texas Motor Speedway is a tri-oval track, the qualifying system used is a single-car, one-lap system with only one round. Whoever sets the fastest time in the round wins the pole.

Race results 
Stage 1 Laps: 45

Stage 2 Laps: 45

Stage 3 Laps: 110

Standings after the race 

Drivers' Championship standings

Note: Only the first 12 positions are included for the driver standings.

References 

2022 NASCAR Xfinity Series
NASCAR races at Texas Motor Speedway
Andy's Frozen Custard 300
2022 in sports in Texas